Look at You may refer to:

Songs 
"Look at You" (Big & Rich song), 2014
"Look at You", a song and single by Backyard Babies, 1997
"Look at You", a song by George McCrae
"Look at You", a song by Hanson from the 1997 album Middle of Nowhere
"Look at You", a song by Kenny Rogers from the 2013 album You Can't Make Old Friends
"Look at You", a song by Rebecca Black from the 2023 album Let Her Burn
"Look at You", a song by Screaming Trees from the 1996 album Dust

See also 

 Looking at You (disambiguation)
 Look at You Now (disambiguation)
 Look at Me (disambiguation)
 Look at Us (disambiguation)